Mario Rene Carter (born 23 July 1987) is a Caymanian footballer who plays as a midfielder. He has represented the Cayman Islands during World Cup qualifying matches in 2008 and 2011, and in the 2010 Caribbean Championship.

References

Association football midfielders
Living people
1987 births
Caymanian footballers
Cayman Islands international footballers
Elite SC players
Scholars International players